The Saint Petersburg Institute of History (N. P. Lihachov Mansion) is a research institute of the Russian Academy of Sciences in the field of Russian and foreign history. It is part of the Department of Historical and Philological Sciences of the Russian Academy of Sciences.

References

External links 
http://www.spbiiran.nw.ru/history/

Institutes of the Russian Academy of Sciences
Organizations with year of establishment missing